Rosellini refers to:

Albert Rosellini (1910–2011), former governor of Washington State, USA
Governor Albert D. Rosellini–Evergreen Point Bridge, official name of the Evergreen Point Floating Bridge in Washington State, USA
Ferdinando Pio Rosellini (1814-1872), Italian mathematician and botanist, brother of Ippolito
Ippolito Rosellini (1800–1843), Italian Egyptologist, brother of Ferdinando Pio
Stevie Rosellini, character played by James Belushi in the 1999 film Angel's Dance

See also
Rossellini
Bernardo Rossellino